SpongeBob's Atlantis SquarePantis is a 2007 video game based on the Nickelodeon animated television series SpongeBob SquarePants, specifically the Atlantis SquarePantis TV movie. The Wii and PlayStation 2 versions were developed by Blitz Games. The Game Boy Advance and Nintendo DS versions were developed by Altron. It was followed by Drawn to Life: SpongeBob SquarePants Edition, this was the last SpongeBob SquarePants game to be released on the Game Boy Advance console.

Plot
(The beginning of this plot is not featured in the Nintendo DS version of the game, only the flashback is) The game begins with SpongeBob and his friends escaping from Atlantis. Meanwhile, Plankton rampages around Atlantis with a tank he "borrowed" until he comes across the gang. SpongeBob and Patrick begin to remember how they got into this mess. They began having a flashback that begins with them blowing bubbles until they get trapped in a big bubble that carries them into a cave. The duo make their way through the cave, avoiding ghost pirates while searching for ladders to venture deeper into the caverns, where they find the missing half of the Atlantean Amulet (Patrick thinks it is related to SpongeBob's ancestors because of the word "antis" on it). They take it to the Bikini Bottom Museum to see what it is, taking pictures of exhibits and taking down tourists and security blocking the way. Squidward is shocked to see that they found the other half of the amulet. Sandy and Mr. Krabs tag along while walking in the museum. Squidward conjoins the two halves and the path to Atlantis is revealed: the path is a flying bus. The bus is powered by song, and the group starts to sing to get to Atlantis. The bus crash-lands along the way due to a mistake in Patrick's part, forcing the gang to drive the bus around Atlantis to find the bus pieces and tool kits needed to fix the bus.

After repairing the bus and arriving at Atlantis, the group is greeted by the Lord Royal Highness (or LRH). LRH gives them a tour around the Atlantean palace, in which they had to avoid traps that were set around Atlantis for some reason. Mr. Krabs begins to collect some treasure to take with him with some help from Sandy and her bubble catching gun. Squidward poses for the artists in the art studio. Unbeknownst to them, Plankton hid in the Atlantis bus compartment on the way here. He plans to use the Atlantean weapons, the most advanced of all time, to destroy SpongeBob and his friends, and take over the world. After getting out of the bus, he sneaks around Atlantis and makes his way to the weapon room.

While taking pictures of attractions (also taking down tourists and Atlantean guards blocking the way), Patrick accidentally destroys the oldest living bubble and tell the truth to LRH, who shows them the real bubble. Squidward reminds them that the bubble that Patrick destroyed was a prop for tourists. Patrick again accidentally pops it for real, angering LRH. The group make a run for it, in which they must evade Atlantean forces while searching for paper clips to unlock doors. Later, Sandy uses Squidward as a gun to take down the soldiers. Plankton rampages around the city in his tank just like in the beginning and confronts the gang, ending the flashback. He fires his weapon, but is shocked to see it shoots ice cream. LRH captures Plankton, believing he is a talking speck, and displays him as a replacement for the recently destroyed bubble and as a replacement to the national treasure of Atlantis. He then orders one of his soldiers to get rid of the amulet so that the troublemakers can't return. The soldier makes his way across Atlantis to the dumpster and tosses the amulet into it. The gang then heads home back to Bikini Bottom on board the bus.

Gameplay

Console versions 
The main characters (SpongeBob, Patrick, Sandy, Squidward, Mr. Krabs, and Plankton) have different abilities, most often, these abilities are related to them in one way or another. SpongeBob can use his spatula to flip things and open a portcullis. Patrick can lift other characters or an anchor and throw them over to another platform and then pull him across. Squidward, on the other hand, uses the tentacles on his feet to run across moving carpets and on treadmills to break open doors or a portcullis. Mr. Krabs uses his pockets to attract him to money and sometimes clear path by absorbing the money. He can also get across platforms by being attracted to the money across. Sandy uses her lasso to get over the gaps by grabbing bridge handles and opening the bridges herself by pulling the lasso. She can also grab things or other characters. Plankton does not have any special moves and can only be played as in certain missions. Only 5 actors got to return from the TV special Tom Kenny, Bill Fagerbakke, Carolyn Lawrence, Rodger Bumpass and Doug Lawrence

Handheld versions 
The main characters (except Plankton) are controlled in pairs. Upon finding a changing station, the player can choose which two characters to control. These characters have different abilities when one character picks up the other and then presses L and the character that is being held does a special move. (For example, if SpongeBob picks up Sandy and the player presses L, Sandy will flip in the air and do an exploding karate chop. This only works with the Nintendo DS version of the game.)

Reception 

According to Metacritic, the Nintendo DS version received "mixed or average reviews". On GameRankings, the PlayStation 2, Wii, Nintendo DS, and Game Boy Advance versions of Atlantis SquarePantis hold ratings of 60%, 62%, 66%, and 72%, respectively. An IGN review of the DS version was headlined "SpongeBob actually managed to be boring." Likewise, the most-criticized aspects of all versions were the clunky camera control, the lackluster AI, and the annoying method of having to return to the start of the level to switch characters. It was also called "too short" and "too easy" for older gamers. An IGN review of the Wii version called the game "second-rate", "sloppy", "tedious", and "really boring". The graphics were criticized for being "bland". The PlayStation 2 version was criticized for the same reasons but was given a slightly lower rating, because IGN wrote that Wiimote controls spice up the shooting games.

References

External links 
 SpongeBob's Atlantis SquarePantis at GameSpot
 SpongeBob's Atlantis SquarePantis (PlayStation 2, Wii) at MobyGames
 SpongeBob's Atlantis SquarePantis (Nintendo DS) at MobyGames

2007 video games
Game Boy Advance games
Nintendo DS games
Wii games
PlayStation 2 games
SpongeBob SquarePants video games
THQ games
Altron games
Action-adventure games
Video games developed in Japan
Video games developed in the United Kingdom
Blitz Games Studios games
Multiplayer and single-player video games